Hansford Dade Duncan Twiggs (March 25, 1837 – March 25, 1917) was a Georgia attorney, Democratic politician, judge, and Confederate military officer during the American Civil War.  He was a great-grandson of American Revolutionary War general John Twiggs.  He died in Savannah, Georgia on his 80th birthday and was buried in the Summerville Cemetery in Augusta, Georgia.

References
Ghost Fry - Trials and Tribulations: The Life of Judge H.D.D. Twiggs, Part One
Hansford Dade Duncan Twiggs - Men of Mark in Georgia - Volume 6
Ghost Fry - Trials and Tribulations: The Life of Judge H.D.D. Twiggs, Part Four 
Ghost Fry - Trials and Tribulations: The Life of Judge H.D.D. Twiggs, Part Six
H.D.D. Twiggs Obituary - Confederate Veteran Magazine - Confederate Veteran, Volume 25, Issue 7 - p. 327

1837 births
1917 deaths
Members of the Georgia House of Representatives
Georgia (U.S. state) state court judges
Confederate States Army officers
Politicians from Savannah, Georgia
University of Georgia alumni
University of Pennsylvania alumni
19th-century American judges